Portrait of a Lady is a 1936 historical novel by the British writer Eleanor Smith. In the Victorian era a married woman is attracted by a young gypsy, but eventually manages to resist him.

References

Bibliography
 Vinson, James. Twentieth-Century Romance and Gothic Writers. Macmillan, 1982.

1936 British novels
Novels by Lady Eleanor Smith
British romance novels
British historical novels
Novels set in the 19th century
Hutchinson (publisher) books